Mimia or some variant thereof may refer to:

 Mimia (butterfly), a living genus of butterflies of the family Hesperiidae
 Mimia (fish), a fossil genus of fish of the class Actinopterygii
 Tales of Princess Mimia or Mimia-hime (ミミア姫), a manga series
 MIMIA, Ministry for Immigration Multicultural Indigenous Affairs, an agency in Australia